Jesus Wept is an American Christian rock band who primarily play hardcore punk, metalcore, post-hardcore, and post-metal. They come from Erie, Pennsylvania. The band started making music in 2004, and their members are Dan Quiggle, Dave Quiggle, Sean Sundy, Jon Beckman, and Adam Salaga. Their first extended play, Sick City, was released by Strike First Records in 2006. The band released a studio album, Show's Over, in 2006, with Strike First Records.

Background
Jesus Wept is a Christian hardcore and Christian metal band from Erie, Pennsylvania. Their members are vocalist, Dan Quiggle, guitarists Dave Quiggle and Sean Sundy, bassist Jon Beckham, and drummer Adam Salaga. All the members of Jesus Wept were former members of xDisciplex A.D.

Music history
The band commenced as a musical entity in 2004, with their first release, being an extended play, Sick City, released by Strike First Records, in 2006. The first studio album, Show's Over, was released on April 11, 2006, by Strike First Records.

Members
Current members
 Dan Quiggle - vocals 
 Dave Quiggle - guitar 
 Sean Sundy - guitar
 Jon Beckman - bass
 Adam Salaga - drums

Discography
Studio albums
 Show's Over (April 11, 2006, Strike First)
EPs
 Sick City (2004, Independent)

References

External links
Official website

2004 establishments in Pennsylvania
Musical groups established in 2004
Musical groups from Pennsylvania
Facedown Records artists
Strike First Records artists